Piotr Reiss (born 20 June 1972) is a Polish former professional footballer who played as a striker. He is widely regarded as a Lech Poznań all-time favourite and achieved legendary status among fans, having captained them for many years and being an ardent fan of the club himself.

Club career

Born in Poznań, Reiss is one of Lech Poznań's most notable players ever. He had a spell in German clubs but he claimed that it was so that he could help out Lech Poznań financially through the transfer fee they received for him, as at the time the club was struggling financially.

He captained Lech for many years after he returned from Germany, becoming one of Ekstraklasa's most renowned and best players.

Towards the end of his career, wanting to stay in his hometown, he went to play for Poznań's second professional team, I liga side Warta, scoring 35 goals, before returning to Lech in order to enjoy a farewell season with his favourite club in 2012. On 21 April 2013, at the age of 40 years and 305 days, he became the oldest recorded goalscorer in Ekstraklasa's history after scoring in a 3–1 home win against Zagłębie Lubin. He retired at the end of the season, with a total of 109 goals in Polish top division.

International career
Reiss featured for the Poland national team. Reiss' debut for Poland took place on 10 November 1998 in an away game against Slovakia, scoring the opening goal. In total, he earned four caps and one goal.

Post-playing career
After retiring from football, he became a youth coach, establishing a youth football academy called Akademia Reissa, which trains hundreds of children and co-operates with Lech's youth system.

Honours
Lech Poznań
 Polish Cup: 2004–05, 2008–09
 Polish Super Cup: 2004

Individual
 Ekstraklasa top scorer: 2009–10

References

External links

 
 

1972 births
Living people
Footballers from Poznań
Polish footballers
Association football forwards
Lech Poznań players
Amica Wronki players
Hertha BSC players
MSV Duisburg players
SpVgg Greuther Fürth players
Warta Poznań players
Poland international footballers
Ekstraklasa players
I liga players
II liga players
Bundesliga players
2. Bundesliga players
Polish expatriate footballers
Polish expatriate sportspeople in Germany
Expatriate footballers in Germany